Nuttall mountains in Wales are mountains in Wales that are at least 2000ft tall.

Number and breakdown of Nuttals 
 there were 189 Nuttals in Wales.

The table below of 189 Welsh Nuttalls at October 2018, include:

Nuttall mountains in Wales by height

Bibliography

References

See also 
 List of highest mountains in Wales
Lists of mountains and hills of Wales
Mountains and hills of Wales
Nuttalls
Landmarks in Wales
Climbing areas of Wales
Welsh peaks by listing